Dubois County is a county located in the U.S. state of Indiana. As of 2020, the population was 43,637. The county seat is Jasper. Dubois County is part of the Jasper Micropolitan Statistical Area.

History
Dubois County was formed on December 20, 1818, from Orange, Pike and Perry counties. It is named for Toussaint Dubois, a Frenchman who fought in the American Revolutionary War, the Battle of Tippecanoe and the War of 1812. Dubois was a merchant who lived mainly in Vincennes. He drowned in 1816 while crossing the Little Wabash River near Lawrenceville, Illinois.

In 1818, as many as half of the residents of the county died of milk sickness. The plant contains the potent toxin temetrol, which is passed through the milk. The migrants from the East were unfamiliar with the Midwestern plant and its effects.

Dubois County switched to the Central Time Zone on April 2, 2006, and returned to the Eastern Time Zone on November 4, 2007; both changes were controversial as Huntingburg wished to remain on Central Time while Jasper never wanted to leave Eastern Time.

The original county seat was Portersville. In 1830, the county seat was moved south to Jasper.

Geography

Cities
 Jasper
 Huntingburg

Towns
 Birdseye
 Ferdinand
 Holland

Census-designated places
 Dubois

Other unincorporated places

 Ireland
 Bretzville
 Celestine
 Crystal
 Cuzco
 Duff
 Ellsworth
 Haysville
 Hillham
 Johnsburg
 Kellerville
 Kyana
 Maltersville
 Mentor
 Millersport
 Portersville
 Schnellville
 Saint Anthony
 Saint Henry
 Saint Marks
 Thales
 Zoar

Townships

 Bainbridge
 Boone
 Cass
 Columbia
 Ferdinand
 Hall
 Harbison
 Jackson
 Jefferson
 Madison
 Marion
 Patoka

Adjacent counties
 Martin County (north)
 Orange County (northeast)
 Crawford County (east)
 Perry County (southeast/CT Border)
 Spencer County (south/CT Border)
 Warrick County (southwest/CT Border)
 Pike County (west)
 Daviess County (northwest)

Climate and weather 

Government

The county government is a constitutional body, and is granted specific powers by the Constitution of Indiana, and by the Indiana Code.

County Council: The county council is the legislative branch of the county government and controls all the spending and revenue collection in the county. Representatives are elected from county districts. The council members serve four-year terms. They are responsible for setting salaries, the annual budget, and special spending. The council also has limited authority to impose local taxes, in the form of an income and property tax that is subject to state level approval, excise taxes, and service taxes.

Board of Commissioners: The executive body of the county is made of a board of commissioners. The commissioners are elected county-wide, in staggered terms, and each serves a four-year term. One of the commissioners, typically the most senior, serves as president. The commissioners are charged with executing the acts legislated by the council, collecting revenue, and managing the day-to-day functions of the county government.

Court: The county maintains a small claims court that can handle some civil cases. The judge on the court is elected to a term of four years and must be a member of the Indiana Bar Association. The judge is assisted by a constable who is also elected to a four-year term. In some cases, court decisions can be appealed to the state level circuit court.

County Officials: The county has several other elected offices, including sheriff, coroner, auditor, treasurer, recorder, surveyor, and circuit court clerk. Each of these elected officers serves a term of four years and oversees a different part of county government. Members elected to county government positions are required to declare party affiliations and to be residents of the county.

Dubois County is part of Indiana's 8th congressional district and is represented in Congress by Republican Larry Bucshon. It is also part of Indiana Senate districts 47 and 48, and Indiana House of Representatives districts 63, 73 and 74.

Demographics

As of the 2010 United States Census, there were 41,889 people, 16,133 households, and 11,459 families residing in the county. The racial makeup of the county was 95.1% white, 0.5% Asian, 0.3% black or African American, 0.2% American Indian, 3.1% from other races, and 0.9% from two or more races. Those of Hispanic or Latino origin made up 6.0% of the population. In terms of ancestry, 58.0% were German, 9.0% were American, 8.1% were Irish, and 6.7% were English.

Of the 16,133 households, 34.2% had children under the age of 18 living with them, 58.3% were married couples living together, 8.6% had a female householder with no husband present, 29.0% were non-families, and 24.7% of all households were made up of individuals. The average household size was 2.54 and the average family size was 3.03. The median age was 39.9 years.

The median income for a household in the county was $47,697 and the median income for a family was $64,286. Males had a median income of $42,078 versus $31,411 for females. The per capita income for the county was $24,801. About 6.9% of families and 9.6% of the population were below the poverty line, including 12.1% of those under age 18 and 10.4% of those age 65 or over.

2020 census

Economy

Personal income
The median income for a household in the county was $44,169, and the median income for a family was $50,342. Males had a median income of $32,484 versus $23,526 for females. The per capita income for the county was $20,225.  About 2.90% of families and 6.20% of the population were below the poverty line, including 5.30% of those under age 18 and 7.30% of those age 65 or over.

Tourism
Patoka Lake is located along the county's eastern borders with both Crawford and Orange Counties. Several annual national tournaments are held there.

The Hoosier National Forest is located in the county. Part of it is protected.

Education
Public education in Dubois County is administered through four school corporations:
 Greater Jasper Consolidated Schools
 Southeast Dubois School Corporation
 Southwest Dubois School Corporation
 Northeast Dubois County School Corporation

High Schools
 Jasper High School (Greater Jasper Schools, Jasper)
 Forest Park High School (Southeast Dubois Schools, Ferdinand)
 Southridge High School (Southwest Dubois Schools, Huntingburg)
 Northeast Dubois High School (Northeast Dubois Schools, Dubois)

Infrastructure

Major highways
  Interstate 64
  U.S. Route 231
  Indiana State Road 56
  Indiana State Road 64
  Indiana State Road 145
  Indiana State Road 161
  Indiana State Road 162
  Indiana State Road 164
  Indiana State Road 264
  Indiana State Road 545

See also
 List of public art in Dubois County, Indiana
 National Register of Historic Places listings in Dubois County, Indiana

References

External links
 Dubois County Website

 
Indiana counties
1818 establishments in Indiana
Populated places established in 1818
Southwestern Indiana
Jasper, Indiana micropolitan area